Ellen Boakye is a Ghanaian cardiologist for children. She is known for winning 18 awards for distinguishing herself in her course of study.

Education 
Boakye was born in Kokofu in the Ashanti Region of Ghana. She had her primary and secondary level education at Petra International School in Breman Read and the Yaa Asantewaa Secondary School in Kumasi respectively. She then studied further at the University of Ghana Medical School. During her Bachelor of Science degree graduation, she won 8 out the 9 awards presented. In 2017, she won 10 awards at the Vice-Chancellor's Academic Award Ceremony held at the Great Hall of the University of Ghana. She is known to have won the highest number of awards that year, having swept 10 awards out of the 156 awards given out.

Career 
She currently works as one of the few children's cardiologists in Ghana.

Awards 
She has won several other awards which includes:

 2017 - The People's Choice Practitioners Awards
 2017 - HELEH Africa People's Choice Practitioners Honours

References

Living people
Year of birth missing (living people)
University of Ghana alumni
Ghanaian cardiologists
Women cardiologists
People from Ashanti Region
Ghanaian pediatricians
Yaa Asantewaa Girls' Senior High School alumni